Igrim Airport  is a regional airport in Igrim, Russia. It is served by UTair using An-24 aircraft.

Airlines and destinations

External links
 Russian Air Fields: Igrim Airport

Airports in Khanty-Mansi Autonomous Okrug